The Qidwai or Kidwai are a community of Muslims in India and Pakistan and throughout the Middle East often considered the premier subdivision of Shaikhs due to their Palestinean/Israeli lineage. Their lineage traces back to Jewish roots and Bani Israel heritage. They are mostly settled in the state of Uttar Pradesh in India. They are also settled in the city of Karachi, Sindh, Pakistan, and also in areas of the Middle East specifically, Saudi Arabia , Palestine and Qatar. The Qidwai, together with the Milki, Malik and Chaudhary form a community of substantial landowners.

History and origin

The Qidwai or Kidwai are a community of Shaikhs in Pakistan and India. They are mostly settled in the state of Uttar Pradesh in India. They are also settled in the city of Karachi, Sindh, Pakistan. The Qidwai claim descent from Qidwa, a son of the Sultans of Rum, in what is now modern Turkey. There are differing traditions as to the ethnic origin. Some sources claim he was a descendant of original Jews of Medina. While other sources claim that he was a Bani Israil descendant by lineage. This reaffirms their monotheistic beliefs unlike other Muslim converts who were formally polytheists. Qidwa fell out the Sultan, his brother, and migrated to India, with wife and son. There he became a close associate of the famous Sufi saint, Moinuddin Chishti. The saint is said to have sent him to the Awadh region to spread Islam, where he is said to have won over fifty villages to Islam.

The Qidwai were native Muslims of Uttar Pradesh. Sufi saints are claimed to have gone to the Awadh region to spread Islam, where he is said to have won over fifty villages to Islam. These fifty villages were later awarded to him, and the region became known as Qidwara. According to another tradition, Qidwa is said have defeated a local ruler in the Awadh region by the name of Raja Jagdeopur. This Raja was said to have belonged to the aboriginal tribal community. The original settlement of the tribe was Juggaur in Lucknow district, from where they spread to Barabanki District. The taluqdar families have historically intermarried with the Awadhi Bhatti, a neighbouring Muslim Rajput community, with whom they share many cultural traits.

Present circumstances

The abolishment of the zamindar system by the newly independent India in 1947 had a major impact on the Qidwai community. The larger estates were broken, and land given to the farmers who worked on their lands. This led to some emigration of the Qidwais to Pakistan. 
The Qidwais are still found mainly in the districts of Lucknow.

See also
 Sayyid
 Siddiqui
 Shaikhs in South Asia

References

Social groups of Pakistan
Social groups of Uttar Pradesh
Muslim communities of India
Shaikh clans
Surnames
Muslim communities of Uttar Pradesh